Hisonotus bocaiuva is a species of catfish in the family Loricariidae. It is native to South America, where it occurs in the São Francisco River basin in Brazil. It reaches 2.4 cm (0.9 inches) SL and was described in 2013.

References 

Otothyrinae
Fish of the São Francisco River basin
Fish described in 2013